Dressing for Breakfast is a Channel 4 sitcom which ran between 1995 and 1998 about two women, Louise (Beatie Edney) and Carla (Holly Aird).

The series was based on a 1988 book with the same title by Stephanie Calman who also wrote the series.

Storyline 
The plot mainly concerns 29-year-old jewellery maker/seller Louise and her quest to find the perfect man. Her interfering left wing activist mother Liz (Charlotte Cornwell) gets in the way. In her search for a boyfriend she makes some wrong choices and gets advice from best friend Carla and her husband Dave (Nigel Lindsay).

Reception 
The TV series was generally well received. It gained acclaim for featuring strong female characters and its frank look at female sexuality.  It proved popular with audiences and was commissioned for three series broadcast between 1995 and 1998.

Cast 
The cast included:

 Beatie Edney  as Louise
 Holly Aird as Carla
 Charlotte Cornwell as Liz
 Nigel Lindsay as Dave
 Mark Aiken as Mike (S3) 
 Sophie Stanton as Rose
 Robert Langdon Lloyd as Fabrizio (S1) 
 Philip Glenister as Mark (S1 Ep2) 
 Andrew Clover as Laurence (S3) 
 Richard Durden as Graham (S2) 
 Lucy Robinson as Sarah (S3) 
 Sam Kelly as Creepy Man
 Omid Djalili as Turkish Man (S1 Ep4)
 Ray Fearon as Steve (S1 Ep4) 
 Juliette Gruber as Sophie (S1 Ep4)

Trivia 
There is only a 13 year age difference between Charlotte Cornwell who portrayed Louise's mother and Beatie Edney (Louise).

References

External links 
 
 BBC Comedy Guide

1995 British television series debuts
1998 British television series endings
1990s British sitcoms
Channel 4 sitcoms